Qingyi River (Chinese: 青弋江) is a major tributary of lower Yangtze River. It is the longest tributary river of lower Yangtze River valley, as well as the longest river originated in Anhui Province. The source of Qingyi River is in Huang Mountains. It has about 30 tributaries, including Hui River, Machuan River, Gufeng River and Yangxi River.

Tributaries of the Yangtze River
Rivers of Anhui